Panipat Elevated Corridor is an Indian elevated 6-lane expressway located in Panipat, Haryana. The entire stretch has been developed into an elevated 6 lane access controlled highway to by-pass the city of Panipat. 

The expressway was built to ease the traffic on NH-1 (Now NH-44, also known as the GT Road) between Delhi and Amritsar. It is 10 km long. This INR 4.22 Billion build-operate-transfer (BoT) project has been executed by L&T Panipat Elevated Corridor Limited (L&T PECL), in a time period of 28 months at a cost of INR 325 crores. National Highways Authority of India had allotted a 20 year concession period (which started in January 2006)  to L&T PECL to finance, design, build, operate and maintain this facility.

See also
 Expressways & highways in Haryana

References

Expressways in Haryana
Transport in Panipat